Cochigró  is a corregimiento in Changuinola District, Bocas del Toro Province, Panama. It was created by Law 18 of February 26, 2009.

References

Corregimientos of Bocas del Toro Province